The 2011 Conference USA men's soccer tournament was the seventeenth edition of the Conference USA Men's Soccer Tournament. The tournament decided the Conference USA champion and guaranteed representative into the 2011 NCAA Division I Men's Soccer Championship. The tournament was hosted by the University of Tulsa and the games were played at the Hurricane Soccer & Track Stadium.

Bracket

Schedule

Quarterfinals

Semifinals

Final

Statistics

Goalscorers

Awards

All-Tournament team
Arthur Ivo, SMU (Offensive MVP)
Diogo de Almeida, SMU (Defensive MVP)
Jaime Ibarra, SMU
T.J. Nelson, SMU
Vance Benson, South Carolina
Eric Martinez, South Carolina
Mladen Lemez, UAB
Babayele Sodade, UAB
Carl Woszczyski, UAB
Andrew Quintana, UCF
McKauly Tulloch, UCF

References

External links
 

Conference USA Men's Soccer Tournament
Tournament
Conference USA Men's Soccer Tournament
Conference USA Men's Soccer Tournament